Pothole Dome is a granite dome on the west side of Tuolumne Meadows, in Yosemite National Park located at Tioga Road mile marker 18. Near Pothole Dome is Marmot Dome. The summit of the dome is easily accessible by foot from a parking area on the Tioga Road at mile marker 18. The view from the summit includes most of Tuolumne Meadows and in the distance, Cathedral Peak. The dome gives evidence of many of the geologic processes at work in Yosemite during and after the last ice age.  In particular, the stranded, rounded boulders from a glacier that has long since retreated, and the water-eroded "potholes" provide evidence of two ways that water can interact with granite.

References

External links
 Pothole Dome at Yosemite Hikes
 Yosemite National Park Hiking Guides

Geology of Yosemite National Park
Landforms of Tuolumne County, California
Granite domes of Yosemite National Park
Hills of California